The Salon du livre de Toronto is an annual book fair in Toronto, Ontario, Canada, held to celebrate and publicize French language literature. Launched in 1993 as the first French language book fair in Canada outside Quebec, the event features a program of author readings, panel discussions and publisher exhibitions over the course of several days in the fall of each year. It concentrates primarily on Franco-Ontarian authors, although publishers and writers from Quebec and France also participate.

Due to the Franco-Ontarian community's relatively limited access to French language media and bookstores, it serves as an essential venue for promotion and networking between the publishing industry and French language school boards, post-secondary institutions, libraries and other community organizations in the province.

The event was founded by writer and educator Christine Dumitriu Van Saanen, who served as its director general until 2006.

Awards
Since its inception, the event has presented an annual award to a work judged as the year's best work of French literature by a writer from Ontario. Initially named the Grand Prix du Salon du livre de Toronto, it was renamed the Prix Christine-Dumitriu-Van-Saanen in 1999 to honour the event's founder. The award was renamed the Prix Alain-Thomas in 2020, following the death of influential Franco-Ontarian academic Alain Thomas. 

In 2017, the Salon du livre introduced the Prix Québec-Ontario, an award administered jointly with the Salon du livre de Rimouski in Quebec and presented to two writers, one from each province, who have published their first book. The winners in 2017 were Mishka Lavigne (Ontario) for Cinéma, and Christophe Bernard (Quebec) for La bête creuse. The award has not, however, been presented again in the years since 2017.

Grand Prix du Salon du livre de Toronto (1993-1998)

Prix Christine-Dumitriu-Van-Saanen (1999-2019)

Prix Alain-Thomas (2021-)

References

External links

Annual events in Toronto
Franco-Ontarian organizations
1993 establishments in Ontario
Canadian literary awards
Book fairs in Canada
French-language literary awards
Literary festivals in Ontario